Richard Ferrer is a British journalist and editor of Jewish News since 2009. The Society of Editors named the publication Free Weekly Newspaper of the Year in September 2021.

Ferrer attended the Surrey Institute of Art and Design, and began his career in journalism in 1995, writing for lifestyle magazines including FHM, Maxim  and Vox. After working for the website totallyjewish.com from 2000 to 2004, he edited the Boston Jewish Advocate, America's oldest Jewish newspaper, returning to the UK the following year to become assistant editor at the Mail Online. In 2008 he served as a sub-editor at the Daily Mirror. He has written for the Daily Telegraph and Algemeiner, and has been a regular contributor to the Independent.

In 2012 he created and appeared on the Channel 4 programme "Jewish Mum of the Year". He has been a regular contributor to programmes on BBC Radio 4.

Controversies 
In April 2018, Ferrer wrote an article in The Times titled, "Jeremy Corbyn cannot be trusted by the Jewish community". His article received much backlash. Ferrer has faced criticism for his paper's handling of Jeremy Corbyn and Labour's anti-Semitism problem.

References 

Living people
21st-century British journalists
British newspaper editors
Daily Mail journalists
Daily Mirror people
The Daily Telegraph people
The Independent people
Year of birth missing (living people)